Trechus arthuri is a species of ground beetle in the subfamily Trechinae. It was described by P. Moravec & Lompe, In Lobl & Smetana in 2003.

References

arthuri
Beetles described in 2003